L'Île-Cadieux is a village and municipality in the Montérégie region of Quebec, Canada, part of the Vaudreuil-Soulanges Regional County Municipality. It is located on and contiguous with Cadieux Island, which projects into Lake of Two Mountains just north off Vaudreuil-sur-le-Lac. The population as of the Canada 2011 Census was 105.

History

The island was formerly known as Vaudreuil Island but was named "Île à Cadieu" in an unpublished document of the second half of the nineteenth century. This name could be a reference to one of two Cadieux, Pierre and Hyacinthe, who owned land in the first concession along the Cove of Vaudreuil at that time.

In 1922, the municipality was formed by separating from the Parish Municipality of Saint-Michel-de-Vaudreuil.

Demographics 

Local government
List of former mayors:
 William G. Bailey (1922-1929)
 William Robert Eakin (1929-1932)
 Nelson Webster Howard (1932-1938)
 James Fergus (1938-1953, 1955-1967)
 Douglas Bremner (1953-1955)
 A. M. Leslie (1967-1977)
 J. G. Weiss (1977-1981)
 Michel Derenne (1981-1989)
 Peter Jackson (1989-1993, 1994-2002)
 Réal Rainville (1993-1994)
 Pierre Montesano (2002-2005)
 Marc-André Léger (2005-2013)
 Paul Herbach (2013-2017)
 Daniel Martel (2017–present)

Education
Commission Scolaire des Trois-Lacs operates Francophone schools. It is zoned to École Saint-Michel and École Sainte-Madeleine in Vaudreuil-Dorion.

Lester B. Pearson School Board operates Anglophone schools. It is zoned to Mount Pleasant Elementary School in Hudson.

See also
 List of cities in Quebec

References

External links

 Official website

Incorporated places in Vaudreuil-Soulanges Regional County Municipality
Cities and towns in Quebec
Cadieux, Ile
Greater Montreal